Infraphulia is a Neotropical genus of butterflies in the family Pieridae.

Species
Infraphulia illimani (Weymer, 1890)
Infraphulia ilyodes (Ureta, 1955)
Infraphulia madeleinea Field & Herrera, 1977

References

Pierini
Pieridae of South America
Pieridae genera